Elections to Daventry District Council were held on 3 May 2007. One third of the council was up for election and the Conservative Party stayed in overall control of the council.

After the election, the composition of the council was:
Conservative 35
Liberal Democrat 2
Labour 1

Election result

Ward results

References
2007 Daventry election result
Ward results
Blue hold on Daventry DC 

2007 English local elections
2007
2000s in Northamptonshire